Königs Wusterhausen Central Tower was a , freestanding steel framework tower on the Funkerberg of Königs Wusterhausen, Germany. The tower, with its unique triangular cross section, was built from 1924 to 1925. The tower collapsed during the storm Quimburga on 13 November 1972.

See also

 Lattice tower
 List of towers
 List of famous transmission sites

References

External links
 
 

Lattice towers
Former radio masts and towers
Communication towers in Germany
Dahme-Spreewald
1925 establishments in Germany
Towers completed in 1925
Buildings and structures demolished in 1972
1972 disestablishments in East Germany